Inayatullah (1920 - 1999) was a Pakistani novelist, story writer, and the founding editor of monthly Hikayat Digest.

Early life
Inayatullah was born in a Rajput family on November 1, 1920, in Gujar Khan, Punjab, British India. In 1936, he passed his matriculation examination and joined British army as a clerk. He was in an infantry unit of the British army and fought at Burma front against Japan. In 1944, Inayatullah was taken prisoner by the government of Japan, but he managed to flee from the prison. Then he again joined the British army and was sent by the authorities to Malaysia to counter the rebellions.
After the partition of India, Inayatullah joined the Pakistan Air Force as a corporal. In 1965, when the war started between Pakistan and India, he became a war correspondent.

Writing career
Inayatullah started his career as an editor of the monthly Sayyara digest. He later founded his own publishing house, Maktabae Daastan. In 1970, Inayatullah began publishing a monthly magazine called Hikayat Digest from Lahore. Inayatullah was drawn to writing historical books during the time. He also wrote historical novels, hunting stories, and detective fiction in addition to his editorial job. He also wrote about general psychology, biography, politics, and social evils in his essays.
He published over a hundred works under the pen names Meem Alf, Iltumsh, Ahmad Yar Khan, Sabir Hussain Rajput, Waqas, Mehdi Khan, and Gumnaam Khatoon, along with his original name Inayatullah.

Books

Historical novels
 Andalus Ki Naagin
 Aur Neel Behta Raha - 2 volumes
 Firdaus-e-Iblees - 2 volumes
 Dastaan Eemaan Faroshon Ki - 5 volumes
 Damishq Ke Qaid Khanay Main
 Doob Doob Kar Ubhri Nao
 Hijaaz ki Aandhi
 Aur Aik Boot Shikan Paida Huwa - 4 volumes
 Shamsheer-e-Bay Niyaam - 2 volumes
 Sitaara Jo Toot Gaya
 Ameer Taimoor
 Azaadi ya Jung k Hero

Other novels
 2 Pullon Ki Kahani
 4 Dewari Ke Dareechon Say
 Aik Kahaani
 Main Gunahgar To Nahin
 Khaki Wardi Lal Lahoo
 BRB Behti Rahay Gi
 Akhiyan Meet Ke Sapna Takya
 Fateh Garh Se Farar
 Badar Say Batapur Tak
 4 Deewari Ki Dunya
 Choti Behan Ka Pagla Bhai
 Hamari Shikast Ki Kahani
 Hamzad ka Ishq
 Parcham Urhta Raha
 Jurm Jang Or Jazbaat
 Heeray Ka jigger
 Kala Burqa Jal RahaTha
 Lahore Ki Dehleez Per
 Main Buzdil Tha Aur Wo Mar Gaya hay Tum Zinda Raho
 Main Kisi Ki Beti Nahi
 Manzil Aur Musafir
 Pakistan Aik Payaz Aur Do Rotian
 Panchveen Larki
 Raat ka Rahi
 Patan Patan Kay Paapi
 Payasi Roohen
 Piyasay
 Tahira
 Uljhay Rastay
 Ustani Aur Taxi Driver
 Wajida Veena Aur Watan

Death
Inayatullah died on November 16, 1999, in Lahore at the age of 79.

References

1920 births
1999 deaths
Pakistani male journalists
Pakistani writers
Pakistani editors
Pakistani prisoners and detainees